The MobiBLU DAH-1500i, colloquially referred to as the "Cube", is an MP3 player which is the world's smallest player with FM Radio and Sound Recorder at 24mm (0.94in) cubed. (It is bigger than both the second and third generation iPod shuffle, but the shuffle lacks a display, FM radio reception, and a microphone for sound recording.)  It features WMA-DRM, USB 2.0, and 512MB/1GB/2GB sizes in addition to the features on the Canadian DAH-1500s, such as:

FM radio
FM radio/Voice recorder
MP3/WMA/WMA-DRM playback
Bright OLED display screen
Customizable EQ
10 Hours of battery life
Clock
SRS WOW sound (Simulated 3D sound)
Firmware upgradeable

The player is powered by a SigmaTel 3520 chip. It was featured at least three times in Wired Magazine in 2005.

For a time, the Cube was sold exclusively by Wal-Mart, but it can now be found at other online retailers.

Accessories 
For such a prominently tiny product, it offers a total of 11 accessories according to mobiBLU's Online Store. Three of these accessories come standard with most Cubes, while some featured Wal-Mart packages come with an additional one for free. Two official accessories resound with the "Cube" design.

Neck Strap Earphone (standard)
USB/Charger Cable (standard)
Protective "Crate" Case (standard, cube-shaped)
AC Charger 
Mini Jack (smaller, simpler USB/Charger jack)
Portable Charger
Finger Strap
Armband
Car Charger
Speaker (cube-shaped)
FM transmitter (cube-shaped)

Various cube-shaped Skins have not been listed nor announced at the American website or shop. Currently mobiblu.biz is the  US website for the product, so replacement parts are available.

Newer versions
A newer version of the Cube, the Cube2, was released about two years after the DAH-1500i. The current version on the market is the Cube3.

Firmware
The CD that the DAH-1500i originally shipped with contained firmware version 100.100.105. The most recent version available is 100.600.616, but player crashed after update.

Harvard researcher Guillaume Tena created a tool to modify the firmware so that users can change the animation of a music note/mobiBLU logo that appears when the player is turned on. The tool is based on the 100.100.122 version.

See also

Cube2
Q-Be

External links 
Mobiblu page for DAH-1500i firmware download (in Korean)
Firmware recovery guide Sigmatel recovery guide
User review of the DAH-1500i and some good photos
A review by PC Magazine
Anything But iPod Review of the "Cube"
DAPReview's Review of the "Cube"
Review of the Cube by Youtuber DankPods

Digital audio players